"Teddy Picker" is a song by the English indie rock band Arctic Monkeys, released as the third single from their second album Favourite Worst Nightmare.  It was released on 3 December 2007 in the United Kingdom. The song entered the UK Singles Chart at number 20.

Music video
The video was directed by Roman Coppola, who has previously worked with The Strokes, Daft Punk and Phoenix. The whole video was completed in one day and features the band performing the song live in RAK Studios, London and walking to a local pub. It also won them Best Video at the 2008 NME Awards.

Track listing

Charts

Certifications

References

2007 singles
Arctic Monkeys songs
Songs written by Alex Turner (musician)
Song recordings produced by James Ford (musician)
2006 songs
Domino Recording Company singles
Music videos directed by Roman Coppola